Levon Robertovich Bayramyan (born 17 January 1998) is a Russian football player of Armenian descent who plays for FC Druzhba Maykop.

Club career
He made his debut in the Russian Football National League for FC Krasnodar-2 on 22 August 2020 in a game against FC Akron Tolyatti.

Personal life
His older brother Khoren Bayramyan is also a professional footballer.

References

External links
 
 Profile by Russian Football National League
 

1998 births
Russian sportspeople of Armenian descent
Sportspeople from Rostov Oblast
People from Matveyevo-Kurgansky District
Living people
Russian footballers
Association football midfielders
FC Krasnodar-2 players
FC Alashkert players
FC SKA Rostov-on-Don players
Russian First League players
Russian Second League players
Armenian First League players
Russian expatriate footballers
Expatriate footballers in Armenia
Russian expatriate sportspeople in Armenia